Tracy Mutinhiri is the Zimbabwe Deputy Minister of Labour and Social Welfare. She is the Member of House of Assembly for Marondera East (ZANU-PF).

Since 2009 rumours exist around Mutinhiri being sympathetic to the MDC party. This has led to various forms of threats and harassment on her person, especially after the reelection of Lovemore Moyo as speaker of parliament at the end of March 2011. In this election Mutinhiri was suspected to be one of the two ZANU-PF votes in favour of the MDC candidate. The attacks also included attempted invasions of her farm in Marondera.

She was placed on the European Union sanctions list from 2007 to 2011.

References

Year of birth missing (living people)
Living people
Members of the National Assembly of Zimbabwe
ZANU–PF politicians
21st-century Zimbabwean women politicians
21st-century Zimbabwean politicians